Lithuania competed in the 2022 World Games in Birmingham, United States, from 7 to 17 July 2022. The games were originally scheduled for July 2021, but were postponed due to the rescheduling of the Tokyo 2020 Olympic Games. Athletes representing Lithuania won one gold medal and one bronze medal. The country finished in 45th place in the medal table.

Medalists

Competitors
The following is the list of number of competitors in the Games.

Air sports

Lithuania competed in air sports.

Dancesport

Lithuania qualified three couples to mixed pair standard ballroom dancing competition.

Kickboxing

Lithuania competed in kickboxing.

Orienteering

References

Nations at the 2022 World Games
2022
2022 in Lithuanian sport